The following is a list of mayors of the city of Donetsk, Ukraine. It includes positions equivalent to mayor, such as chairperson of the city council executive committee.

Mayors 

 Zuzulya Pavlo Omelyanovich (Зузуля Павло Омелянович), 1917
  (Косенко Костянтин Андрійович), 1917
 Alfiorov Pavel Alexandrovich (Алфьоров Павло Олександрович), 1917-1918
  (Залмаєв Яків Васильович), 1917-1918
  (Ієйте Семен Львович), 1917
 , 1918-1919
 Jacob Maximovich Bogomolov (Богомолов Яків Максимович), 1919
  (Жуковський Йосип Гаврилович), 1920-
  (Шкадінов Микола Іванович), 1923—1925
 Vladimir Konstantinovich Ryzhov (Рижов Володимир Костянтинович), 1925—1928
 Dmitry Fedorovich Sbezhnev (Сбєжнєв Дмитро Федорович), 1927—1928
  (Громілін Максим Іванович), 1928—1930
 Tymofiy Pavlovych Kotov (Котов Тимофій Павлович), 1930
 Leonov AF (Леонов А. Ф.), 1930—1931
  (Ананченко Федір Гурійович), 1931—1933
  (Конотоп Віктор Якович), 1933—1935
 Petro Grigorovich Belokonov (Белоконов Петро Григорович), 1935—1937
 Fedor Vasilyevich Starovoitov (Старовойтов Федір Васильович), 1937-1941
 Mykola Hryhorovych Petushkov (Пєтушков Микола Григорович_, 1942
 Andrey Andreevich Eichman (Ейхман Андрій Андрійович), 1942-1943
 Fedor Vasilyevich Starovoitov (Старовойтов Федір Васильович), 1943-1945
  (Матяс Микола Миронович), 1945—1947
 Vasily Nikolaevich Feropontov (Феропонтов Василь Миколайович), 1947—1949
  (Єфименко Георгій Петрович), 1949—1953
  (Бахаєв Олексій Михайлович), 1953—1961
  (Миронов Василь Петрович), 1961—1976
 Victor Georgievich Somov (Сомов Віктор Георгійович), 1976—1978
  (Спицин Володимир Кузьмович), 1978—1987
 George Ilyich Onyschuk (Онищук Георгій Ілліч), 1987—1989
 Eugene Grigorovich Orlov (Орлов Євген Григорович), 1989—1990
  (Махмудов Олександр Гафарович), 1990-1992
 Yukhym Zvyahilsky, 1992-1993
 Volodymyr Vasyliovych Rybak, 1993-2002
 Oleksandr Lukyanchenko, 2002-2014
 Konstantin Lvovich Savinov, 2014
 Igor Yuryevich Martynov, 2014—2016
 Alexey Valeryevich Kulemzin, 2016-

See also
 Donetsk history
 History of Donetsk (in Ukrainian)
 Other names of Donetsk (Aleksandrovka, Stalino, etc.)

References

This article incorporates information from the Russian Wikipedia and Ukrainian Wikipedia.

External links

History of Donetsk
Donetsk